King's Disease is the thirteenth studio album by American rapper Nas. It was released on August 21, 2020, through Mass Appeal Records and marketed by Universal Music Group. It succeeds his twelfth studio album, Nasir, released two years prior. The album features guest appearances from Charlie Wilson, Hit-Boy, Big Sean, Don Toliver, Lil Durk, Anderson .Paak, Brucie B, Nas's supergroup the Firm, Fivio Foreign, and ASAP Ferg.

King's Disease received generally positive reviews and was viewed by music critics as a return to form following the muted reception of Nasir (2018).

The album won the Grammy Award for Best Rap Album at the 63rd Annual Grammy Awards, becoming Nas' first Grammy. The album's sequel, King's Disease II, was released on August 6, 2021 and is Nas's first release to be marketed by Sony Music (through The Orchard subsidiary) since the release of Street's Disciple in 2004.

Background
Following the release of his twelfth studio album Nasir, Nas stated that he would be working on an unfinished album produced by Swizz Beatz and RZA, who both contributed to Nas' compilation album The Lost Tapes 2 in 2019. However, on August 10, 2020, Nas announced via Instagram he would be releasing a different album produced and executive produced by American record producer Hit-Boy, which would become known as King's Disease. Four days later, on August 14, Nas released the album's lead and only single, "Ultra Black", featuring Hit-Boy.

Music videos
The official music video for the album's final track and only bonus track, "Spicy", featuring American rappers Fivio Foreign and ASAP Ferg, was released on October 2, 2020. The official music video for "Replace Me", featuring American rapper Big Sean and American singer Don Toliver, was released on October 21.

Critical reception

King's Disease was met with generally positive reviews from music critics. At Metacritic, which assigns a normalized rating out of 100 from mainstream publications, the album received an average score of 72, based on nine reviews.

Andy Kellman of AllMusic felt that the album was an improvement from the rapper's work in recent years, writing: "Nas is more ruminative and measured, like he's found his stride again, even as he flagrantly contradicts himself and waylays men and women with relationship advice that rings hollow. Going strictly by the conviction and feeling in each line, King's Disease is the MC's best work since 2008." Robin Murray of Clash wrote: "'The King's Disease' finds Nas grappling with a raft of contradictions, contrasting the opulence of his lifestyle with the need for vitality in his message," adding that "it's not perfect, but it's less an end product, and more the search for creative process – by the end, you become convinced the Queens rapper has found his throne." Okla Jones of Consequence of Sound praised the album for its cohesion and production, writing that King's Disease "delivers a feel appropriate for the times" and "hits the mark as being one of the better rap albums of the year." Similarly, Riley Wallace of HipHopDX wrote: "The creative process seems more organized and thought out, allowing Nas to do all the things he's good at, without embellishing any of them."

Reviewing for NME, Will Lavin appraised the album for its lyricism, claiming that the album's lyrics demand "high levels of dissection" and that the album is an "acutely perceptive and culturally relevant body of work that finds its author willing to try out new ideas." He concluded by writing: "There's a genuine conversation to be had about whether it's the best rap album of the year so far."

In a more mixed review, Pete Tosiello of Pitchfork wrote that the album "marks a retreat into a nostalgia-act comfort zone—one which suits Nas, even as it yields diminishing returns." Ryan Feyre of RapReviews.com wrote that the album's biggest missed opportunity lies in "Nas’ inability to reach beyond the ambitious presentation found in everything surrounding the lyrics," adding that "he's entertaining in spurts, but much like his 'godly' contemporary Jay-Z, one has to wonder if what he says ever really matters on King’s Disease anymore." Danny Schwartz of Rolling Stone called the album a "slick Illmatic redux" and a "fresh portrait of Nas' now-mythical hustler years," but criticized the album for attempting to "paper over" the rapper's abuse allegations and showcasing his "increasingly questionable politics when it comes to women," concluding by writing: "26 years after Illmatic, Nas still has room to grow."

Commercial performance
King's Disease debuted at number five on the US Billboard 200 with 47,000 album-equivalent units, of which 28,000 were pure album sales. It serves as Nas's fourteenth top-ten album in the United States.

The album's last track and only bonus track, "Spicy", featuring American rappers Fivio Foreign and ASAP Ferg reached number 96 on the US Billboard Hot 100 and number 36 on the Hot R&B/Hip-Hop Songs chart, and the track "Replace Me" with Big Sean and Don Toliver reached number 49 on the Hot R&B/Hip-Hop Songs chart.

Track listing

Notes
 signifies a co-producer
 signifies an additional producer
 signifies an uncredited co-producer
”Ultra Black” features additional vocals by Corbett, Jon Lewis and Ashlee.
"Full Circle" features additional vocals by Robin Thicke and uncredited vocals by Dr. Dre.
Sample credits 
"Blue Benz" contains a monologue by Louie Rankin in the 1998 film Belly.
"Replace Me" contains interpolations of "Trip", written by Ella Mai Howell, Varren Wade, Quintin Q Gulledge and Dijon MacFarlane, and performed by Ella Mai.
"Til the War Is Won" contains a sample of "Agape" performed by Nicholas Britell in the 2018 film If Beale Street Could Talk.

Personnel
Musicians
MonoNeon – Electric Bass, Producer, Additional Producer: Dwayne "MnoNeon" Thomas Jr. 

Technical
Hit-Boy – engineer 
Mark "Exit" Goodchild – engineer 
Gabriel Zardes – engineer 
David Kim – mixing 
Mike Bozzi – mastering 

Artwork
Harmonia Rosales – artist
Label

 Peter Bittenbender - CEO & Creative Direction
 Annie Chen - VP of Marketing 
 Celeste Li - Marketing

Charts

References

External links

2020 albums
Albums produced by Hit-Boy
Nas albums
Mass Appeal Records albums
Grammy Award for Best Rap Album